Adolf Holl (13 May 1930 – 23 January 2020) was an Austrian Catholic writer and theologian. He lived in Vienna, where he was Chaplain of the University of Vienna and a lecturer in its Department of Catholic Theology. Because of conflicts with Church authorities, he was suspended from his teaching and priestly duties. He wrote many books, including Jesus in Bad Company and The Last Christian: A Biography of Francis of Assisi.

Holl had doctorates in philosophy and theology from the University of Vienna. Ordained a Catholic priest in 1954, he served as a parish priest and professor of theology until 1973, when longstanding controversies with church officials led to his dismissal from university and parish posts.

Published works

 
 
 
 
 
 
 
 
 
 
 
 
 
  Apparently also published as  Translated as 
  Translated as 
 
 
 
  Translated as 
 
 
 
 
 
 
 
 
 
 
 
 
 
 
 
 
  Translated as

References

Further reading

Reviews

Works about Holl 

 
 
 
 
 
 
  60 mins.

Obituaries 

 
 
 
 
 

1930 births
2020 deaths
Austrian male writers
20th-century Austrian Roman Catholic priests
20th-century Austrian Roman Catholic theologians
Academic staff of the University of Vienna
Clergy from Vienna
21st-century Austrian Roman Catholic theologians